Dimitrios Zisidis (born March 26, 1975) is a Greek para-track and field athlete who competed at the 2016 Summer Paralympics in the F32 shot put and club throw. He bronze medalled in the shot put with a personal best distance of 9.24 metres.

See also 
 Greece at the 2016 Summer Paralympics

References 

Dimitrios Zisidis at Paralympic.org

Greek male shot putters
1975 births
Living people
Paralympic athletes of Greece
Athletes (track and field) at the 2008 Summer Paralympics
Athletes (track and field) at the 2012 Summer Paralympics
Athletes (track and field) at the 2016 Summer Paralympics
Paralympic bronze medalists for Greece
Medalists at the 2016 Summer Paralympics
Paralympic medalists in athletics (track and field)
Male club throwers
Paralympic club throwers
Paralympic shot putters
Medalists at the World Para Athletics Championships
20th-century Greek people
21st-century Greek people
Athletes from Thessaloniki